is a Japanese manga series written and illustrated by Yoko Matsushita. The story revolves around shinigami. These Guardians of Death work for Enma Daiō, the king of the dead, sorting out the expected and unexpected arrivals to the Underworld.

An anime television series adaptation by J.C.Staff aired on Wowow from October to December 2000.

Plot

Asato's catchphrase:

Series introduction:

Asato Tsuzuki has been a 'Guardian of Death' for over 70 years. He has the power to call upon twelve shikigami, mythical creatures that aid him in battle. The manga portrays Tsuzuki's relationship with the shinigami in much more detail. Tsuzuki is the senior partner of the Second Division, which watches over the region of Kyūshū.

In the anime, the story begins when Chief Konoe, the boss, and the other main characters discussing recent murders in Nagasaki. The victims all have bite marks and a shortage of blood, which leads to the case being known as "The Vampire Case."

After some food troubles, Tsuzuki travels to Nagasaki with Gushoshin, a flying creature/helper who can speak, and together they do a bit of investigating. The rule is that Guardian of Death are supposed to work in pairs, and until Tsuzuki meets up with his new partner, he needs someone to watch him. However, Gushoshin gets held back by groceries, and Tsuzuki is on his own.

While exploring Nagasaki, Tsuzuki hears a scream and has a run-in with a strange white-haired woman with red eyes, who leaves blood on his collar. Taking this as is a sign that the woman might be the vampire, Tsuzuki tries to follow her. He comes to a church called Oura Cathedral, where he meets the story's primary antagonist, Muraki.

Doctor Kazutaka Muraki is initially portrayed as a pure figure, with much religious and color symbolism. He meets Tsuzuki with tears in his eyes and Tsuzuki, thrown off, asks if Muraki has seen a woman recently. Muraki says no body has been in the church, and Tsuzuki leaves. Tsuzuki later learns that the woman that he encountered is Maria Won, a famous singer from China.

From there Tsuzuki continues through Nagasaki into the area of the city known as Glover Garden, where he is held at gunpoint from behind. His attacker tells him to turn around, and when he does, he discovers a young man glaring at him. He suspects this man is the vampire. Tsuzuki is then saved by Gushoshin. Afterwards Tsuzuki learns that the boy is Hisoka Kurosaki, his new partner, and the rest of the story is heavily based on character development and the relationships between characters.

Later in the Nagasaki Arc (the first fourth of the anime series, and the first collection of the manga), Hisoka is kidnapped by Muraki, and the truth about his death is revealed. Tsuzuki rescues him after his "date" with Muraki, and the series follows the relationship between these three characters, supported and embellished by the rest of the cast.

Media

Manga
The manga was serialized in Hakusensha's semi-monthly shōjo manga magazine, Hana to Yume from the 14th issue of 1996 until the author decided to put the story on hiatus in the 2nd issue of 2003. The published chapters have been collected in 12 volumes with the 12th volume published on January 19, 2010 with revisions that differ from the chapters originally serialized in the magazine. The series resumed serialization in Hana to Yume magazine in the September 2011 issue. The English-language version is published by Viz Media that originally released the first volume on September 14, 2004, and the eleventh on May 2, 2006. From volume 10 onwards the English edition adjusts the chapter enumeration, giving the Japanese and English editions different chapter numbers.

Anime
An anime adaptation of the manga aired on WOWOW beginning on October 10, 2000, to June 24, 2001. The anime was directed by Hiroko Tokita and was animated by J.C. Staff. The series was divided by four story arcs. Central Park Media had licensed the series and released them on DVD in 2003. The series initially aired on AZN Television in 2004. In 2008, the series, along with a few other CPM titles, was aired on Sci-Fi Channel's Ani-Monday block in 2008 and then on their sister network Chiller in 2009. In Canada, the anime series was shown on Super Channel 2 beginning on December 8, 2008. Discotek Media has since licensed the anime and will re-release the series in 2015. The series opening theme is "Eden" by To Destination, while the closing theme is "Love Me" by The Hong Kong Knife.

References to poetry

 The insert song for episode two, Amethyst Remembrance, is based on the poem "I held a Jewel in my fingers" by Emily Dickinson.

Reception

Descendants of Darkness has been called "a gateway drug into shōnen-ai and yaoi" despite it not really being as such. Anime News Network praised the TV series' humor.
Descendants of Darkness sold 10,000 copies in its first few months on the English-language market. Volume 5 of the series ranked 6th in the week ending of May 22, 2005, according to BookScan's Graphic Novel List.

References

External links

Descendants of Darkness
1995 manga
2000 anime television series debuts
Anime series based on manga
Central Park Media
Dark fantasy anime and manga
Discotek Media
Hakusensha franchises
Hakusensha manga
J.C.Staff
Mystery anime and manga
Shinigami in anime and manga
Shōjo manga
Supernatural anime and manga
Viz Media manga
Wowow original programming